Emily Rose (born February 2, 1981) is an American actress. She is best known for her role in the critically acclaimed Uncharted video game series as Elena Fisher and for her lead role as Audrey Parker in the Syfy series Haven (2010–2015).

Early life
Born in Renton, Washington, Rose received her Master of Fine Arts degree in Acting from UCLA in 2006. She also graduated from Vanguard University of Southern California with a degree in Theater Arts. She is the oldest of three children (she has a younger sister and brother) and is aunt to two nephews and a niece.

Career
Rose appeared in the unaired fourth episode of the American television show Smith, and starred as Cass in the HBO drama John from Cincinnati. She played Lena Branigan on Brothers & Sisters. She portrayed Trish Merrick, an employee of Jennings and Rall, on the CBS drama Jericho.

Rose performed voice acting and motion capture for the 2007 PlayStation 3 game Uncharted: Drake's Fortune as the main female character Elena Fisher, then reprised the role in Uncharted 2: Among Thieves in 2009, Uncharted 3: Drake's Deception in 2011 and Uncharted 4: A Thief's End in 2016. Rose played Dr. Tracy Martin in the final season of ER and guest-starred on the January 12, 2009, episode of Two and a Half Men.

The following year, Rose began her stint in the Syfy TV series Haven, playing the main character, FBI SA Audrey Parker. The series ran through 2015. Rose's character is sent to Haven, a seemingly tranquil seaside town in Maine, to apprehend an escaped convict. As the story proceeds, she finds herself entrenched in a decades-long town mystery and ends up quitting the FBI and joining the Haven municipal police department to assist in ridding the town of its "Troubles", as the ongoing town mystery is called. The series was adapted from the Stephen King crime novel The Colorado Kid.

In 2018, Emily portrayed FBI Special Agent Anna Jenlowe in the NCIS episode "Third Wheel".

Personal life
Rose married long-time boyfriend Dairek Morgan on December 6, 2009, in Washington. On January 15, 2013, Rose announced via Twitter that she and her husband were expecting a baby. The tweet included a YouTube pregnancy announcement. A baby boy, Miles Christian Morgan, was born on April 30, 2013. Rose announced via Twitter on August 25, 2015, that she and her husband were expecting their second child. Rose gave birth to her second son, Memphis Ray Morgan, on December 31, 2015. On April 16, 2019,  Rose announced that she and her husband were expecting their third child. Rose gave birth to a girl, Mercy, in June 2019.

Filmography

References

External links

1981 births
American film actresses
American television actresses
American video game actresses
American voice actresses
Living people
People from Renton, Washington
Actresses from Washington (state)
UCLA Film School alumni
Vanguard University alumni
21st-century American actresses